Doll & Em is a British comedy television series created by and starring Emily Mortimer and Dolly Wells. A six-episode order was commissioned by Sky Living in 2013. The series was directed and co-written by Azazel Jacobs. A 124-minute theatrical cut of the series was shown at the London Film Festival, premiering 10 October 2013. Sky Living premiered Doll & Em on 18 February 2014. The American cable network HBO acquired the series in September 2013, and premiered it on 19 March 2014.

On 16 October 2014, Sky Living renewed the show for a second series, which started broadcasting on 3 June 2015 on Sky Atlantic in the UK.

Cast
Emily Mortimer as Em, an actress starring in a new film to be filmed in Los Angeles
Dolly Wells as Doll, Em's best friend and her new personal assistant
Jonathan Cake as Buddy, a producer
Aaron Himelstein as Mike, the director of Em's film

Plot
The show is about an actress named Em and her best friend Doll as they navigate their friendship once Em hires Doll to be her assistant. It also explores the characters' roles in the entertainment industry.  Additionally, the plot concerns the making of Em's new movie.

Episodes

Series 1 (2014)

Series 2 (2015)

References

External links

2010s British comedy television series
2014 British television series debuts
2015 British television series endings
British comedy television shows
English-language television shows
HBO original programming
Sky Living original programming